Peter John Enzenauer (February 2, 1878 – April 11, 1951) was a provincial politician from Alberta, Canada. He served as a member of the Legislative Assembly of Alberta from 1921 to 1935 sitting with the United Farmers caucus in government.

Political career
Enzenauer ran for a seat to the Alberta Legislature for the first time in the 1921 Alberta general election as a candidate for the United Farmers. He won a two way race in the electoral district of Alexandra with over 88% of the popular vote.

Enzenauer ran for a second term in the 1926 Alberta general election. He fought a three way race to keep his seat. His margin of victory dropped but he still returned to office with a big majority.

Enzenauer faced a two battle running for his third term in office in the 1930 Alberta general election. His popular vote increased, and he won a big majority over Liberal candidate F.H. Dunstan.

Enzenauer ran for a fourth term in office in the 1935 Alberta general election but was defeated in a landslide by Social Credit candidate Selmer Berg. He finished a distant second in the five way race.

References

External links
Legislative Assembly of Alberta Members Listing

United Farmers of Alberta MLAs
1951 deaths
1878 births
People from Red Bud, Illinois
American emigrants to Canada